Łysogóry is the largest mountain range in the Świętokrzyskie Mountains of central Poland. It is 25 km long, and runs from the Lubrzanka river in the northwest, to the area of Nowa Słupia  in the southeast. It contains the highest peak of the Świetokrzyskie Mountains (Łysica) and its most famous mountain (Łysa Góra).

Łysogóry can be divided into two parts:
 eastern half, densely covered by the Jodlowa Wilderness (Puszcza Jodlowa), which contains both highest peaks of the range, and it lies within boundaries of Swietokrzyski National Park,
 western half, less forested and with smaller peaks.

Łysogóry is mostly made of quartzite, with numerous stone runs. The range is crossed by several tourist trail - red trail of Edmund Massalski, and two blue trails.

The peaks 

 Łysica – 612 m.
 Łysa Góra – 595 m.
 Ksieza Skala – 550 m.
 Hucka – 547 m.
 Biala Skala – 547 m
 Widna Skala – 544 m
 Sztymber – 530 m
 Chelmiec – 456 m
 Radostowa – 451 m
 Krainski Grzbiet – 428 m
 Wymyslona – 415 m.

References

Mountain ranges of Poland
Landforms of Świętokrzyskie Voivodeship